Pierce Brendan Brosnan  (born 16 May 1953) is an Irish actor and film producer. He is best known as the fifth actor to play secret agent James Bond in the Bond film series, starring in four films from 1995 to 2002 (GoldenEye, Tomorrow Never Dies, The World Is Not Enough and Die Another Day) and in multiple video games.

After leaving school at age 16, Brosnan began training in commercial illustration and went on to attend the Drama Centre in London for three years. Following a stage acting career, he rose to popularity in the television series Remington Steele (1982–1987). After the conclusion of the series, Brosnan appeared in films such as the Cold War spy film The Fourth Protocol (1987) and the comedy Mrs. Doubtfire (1993). After achieving worldwide fame for his role as James Bond, Brosnan took the lead in other major films including the epic disaster adventure film Dante's Peak (1997) and the remake of the heist film The Thomas Crown Affair (1999). Since leaving the role of Bond, he has starred in films such as the musical comedy Mamma Mia! (2008), the political thriller The Ghost Writer (2010), the action fantasy Percy Jackson & the Olympians: The Lightning Thief (2010), the action spy thriller The November Man (2014) and the Mamma Mia! sequel Mamma Mia! Here We Go Again (2018). In 2022, Brosnan played Kent Nelson / Doctor Fate in the DC Extended Universe film Black Adam.

Brosnan has received two Golden Globe Award nominations, for the miniseries Nancy Astor (1982) and for the dark comedy film The Matador (2005). In 1996, along with American film producer Beau St. Clair, he formed a Los Angeles-based production company called Irish DreamTime. He is also known for his charitable work and environmental activism. In 1997, Brosnan received a star on the Hollywood Walk of Fame for his contributions to the film industry. In 2020, he was listed at No. 15 on The Irish Times list of greatest Irish film actors.

Early life 
Brosnan was born on 16 May 1953 in Drogheda, County Louth, the only child of May ( Smith) and carpenter Thomas Brosnan. He has the same name as his grandfather, Pierce Brosnan, who in turn was named after his parents' surnames: John Brosnan and Margaret Pierce. For 12 years, he lived in Navan, County Meath, and said in 1999 that he considers it to be his hometown. His father abandoned the family when Brosnan was an infant. When he was four years old, his mother moved to London to work as a nurse. From that point on, he was largely brought up by his maternal grandparents, Philip and Kathleen Smith. After their deaths, he lived with an aunt and then an uncle, but was subsequently sent to live in a boarding house run by a woman named Eileen. He later said, "Childhood was fairly solitary. I never knew my father. He left when I was an infant. [...] To be Irish Catholic in the 1950s, and have a marriage which was not there, a father who was not there [...] the mother, the wife suffered greatly. My mother was very courageous. She took the bold steps to go away and be a nurse in England. Basically wanting a better life for her and myself. My mother came home once a year, twice a year."

Brosnan was brought up in a Catholic family, and educated in a local school run by the De La Salle Brothers while serving as an altar boy. He left Ireland on 12 August 1964 and went to Scotland to be reunited with his mother and her new husband, William Carmichael, at their home in Longniddry. Carmichael took Brosnan to see a James Bond film for the first time (Goldfinger) at the age of 11. They later moved back to London, where Brosnan was educated at Elliott School in Putney, now known as Ark Putney Academy. When discussing his transition from Ireland to England, he said, "When you go to a very large city, a metropolis like London, as an Irish boy of 10, life suddenly moves pretty fast. [...] And you're Irish. And they make you feel it; the British have a wonderful way of doing that, and I had a certain deep sense of being an outsider." His nickname at school was simply "Irish".

After leaving school at 16, Brosnan decided to be a painter and began training in commercial illustration at Saint Martin's School of Art in London. While attending a rehearsal for a workshop at the Ovalhouse, he saw a fire eater teaching people how to eat fire and decided to join in. He trained for three years as an actor at the Drama Centre London. Describing the feeling of becoming an actor and the influence it had on his life, he said, "When I found acting, or when acting found me, it was a liberation. It was a stepping stone into another life, away from a life that I had, and acting was something I was good at, something which was appreciated. That was a great satisfaction in my life."

Career

Early career
Graduating from the Drama Centre in 1975, Brosnan began working as an acting assistant stage manager at the York Theatre Royal, making his acting debut in Wait Until Dark. Within six months, he was selected by playwright Tennessee Williams to play the role of McCabe in the British première of The Red Devil Battery Sign (billed as "Pierce Brosman"). His performance caused a stir in London and Brosnan still has the telegram sent by Williams, stating only "Thank God for you, my dear boy". In 1977, he was picked by Franco Zeffirelli to appear in the play Filumena by Eduardo De Filippo opposite Joan Plowright and Frank Finlay.

Brosnan continued his career making brief appearances in films such as The Long Good Friday (1980) and The Mirror Crack'd (1980), as well as early television performances in The Professionals, Murphy's Stroke, and Play for Today. He became a television star in the United States with his leading role in the popular miniseries Manions of America. He followed this in 1982 with the BBC's nine-part miniseries Nancy Astor (which aired in America on Masterpiece Theatre) that dramatised the life of Lady Astor, the first woman to sit in the British Parliament. His portrayal of Robert Gould Shaw II garnered him a 1985 Golden Globe Award nomination for Best Supporting Actor.

In 1982, Brosnan moved to Southern California and rose in popularity in the United States playing the title role in the NBC romantic, often-comedic detective series Remington Steele. The Washington Post noted that same year that Brosnan "could make it as a young James Bond." After Remington Steele ended in 1987, Brosnan went on to appear in several films, including The Fourth Protocol (1987), a Cold War thriller in which he starred alongside Michael Caine, The Deceivers and James Clavell's Noble House both in 1988, and The Lawnmower Man (1992). In 1992, he shot a pilot for NBC called Running Wilde, playing a reporter for Auto World magazine with Jennifer Love Hewitt playing his daughter, but the pilot never aired. In 1993 he played a supporting role in the comedy film Mrs. Doubtfire. He appeared in several television films, including Victim of Love (1991), Death Train (1993) and Night Watch (1995), a spy thriller set in Hong Kong. In 2003, Brosnan was rewarded the Irish Film and Television Academy Lifetime Achievement Award for his contribution to Irish Film.

James Bond 

Brosnan first met James Bond film producer Albert R. Broccoli on the sets of For Your Eyes Only, as his first wife, Cassandra Harris, had been cast as Countess Lisl von Schlaf, mistress to Milos Columbo. Broccoli said, "if he can act ... he's my guy" to inherit the role of Bond from Roger Moore. It was reported by both Entertainment Tonight and the National Enquirer that Brosnan was going to inherit another role of Moore's, that of Simon Templar in The Saint. Brosnan denied the rumours in July 1993 but added, "it's still languishing there on someone's desk in Hollywood."

In 1986, NBC cancelled Remington Steele. As Brosnan was offered the role of James Bond, the publicity improved Remington Steeles ratings and it was renewed, contractually requiring Brosnan to return to the show. This caused Eon Productions to have to look elsewhere for the new 007. The producers instead hired Timothy Dalton for The Living Daylights (1987) and Licence to Kill (1989). While Brosnan was reluctant to discuss losing the Bond role, in part because Dalton was a friend, he appeared in Diet Coke commercials portraying what the Los Angeles Times described as "a dashing Bond-like character", and NBC advertised Noble House with Brosnan dressed in a Bond-like tuxedo. Legal disputes between the Bond producers and the studio over distribution rights resulted in the cancellation of a proposed third Dalton film in 1991 and put the Bond series on a hiatus for several years. After the legal issues had been resolved, Dalton decided not to return for a third film. On 7 June 1994, Brosnan was announced as the fifth actor to play Bond.

Brosnan was signed for a three-film Bond deal with the option of a fourth. The first, 1995's GoldenEye, grossed US$350 million worldwide, the fourth-highest worldwide gross of any film in 1995, making it the most successful Bond film since Moonraker, adjusted for inflation. It holds a 78% rating on Rotten Tomatoes, while Metacritic holds it at 65%. In the Chicago Sun-Times, Roger Ebert gave the film 3 stars out of 4, saying that Brosnan's Bond was "somehow more sensitive, more vulnerable, more psychologically complete" than the previous ones, also commenting on Bond's "loss of innocence" since previous films. James Berardinelli described Brosnan as "a decided improvement over his immediate predecessor" with a "flair for wit to go along with his natural charm", but added that "fully one-quarter of Goldeneye is momentum-killing padding."

In 1996, Brosnan formed a film production company called Irish DreamTime along with producing partner and longtime friend Beau St. Clair. Brosnan and St. Clair released Irish DreamTime's first production, The Nephew, in 1998. One year later, the company's second studio project, The Thomas Crown Affair, was released and met both critical and box office success.

Brosnan returned in 1997's Tomorrow Never Dies and 1999's The World Is Not Enough, which were also successful. In 2002, Brosnan appeared for the fourth time as Bond in Die Another Day, receiving mixed reviews similarly to the former two, but was a success at the box office. Brosnan himself subsequently criticised many aspects of his fourth Bond movie. During the promotion, he mentioned that he would like to continue his role as James Bond: "I'd like to do another, sure. Connery did six. Six would be a number, then never come back." Brosnan asked Eon Productions, when accepting the role, to be allowed to work on other projects between Bond films. The request was granted, and for every Bond film, Brosnan appeared in at least two other mainstream films, including several he produced, playing a wide range of roles, ranging from a scientist in Tim Burton's Mars Attacks!, to the title role in Grey Owl, which documents the life of Englishman Archibald Stansfeld Belaney, one of Canada's first conservationists.

Shortly after the release of Die Another Day, the media began questioning whether or not Brosnan would reprise the role for a fifth time. At that time, Brosnan was approaching his 50th birthday. Brosnan kept in mind that both fans and critics were very unhappy with Roger Moore playing the role until the age of 57, but he was receiving popular support from both critics and the franchise fanbase for a fifth instalment. For this reason, he remained enthusiastic about reprising his role. In October 2004, Brosnan said he considered himself dismissed from the role. Although Brosnan had frequently been rumoured as still in the running to play Bond, he had denied it several times, and in February 2005 he posted on his website that he was finished with the role. Daniel Craig took over the role on 14 October 2005. In an interview with The Globe and Mail, Brosnan was asked what he thought of Craig as the new James Bond. He replied, "I'm looking forward to it like we're all looking forward to it. Daniel Craig is a great actor and he's going to do a fantastic job." He re-affirmed this support in an interview to the International Herald Tribune, stating that "[Craig's] on his way to becoming a memorable Bond." Brosnan later admitted that he was hurt by the end of his tenure; "Barbara [Broccoli] and Michael [Wilson] were on the line – 'We're so sorry.' She was crying, Michael was stoic and he said, 'You were a great James Bond. Thank you very much,' and I said, 'Thank you very much. Goodbye.' That was it. I was utterly shocked and just kicked to the kerb with the way it went down."

During his tenure on the James Bond films, Brosnan also took part in James Bond video games. In 2002, Brosnan's likeness was used as the face of Bond in the James Bond video game 007: Nightfire (voiced by Maxwell Caulfield). In 2004, Brosnan starred in the Bond game James Bond 007: Everything or Nothing, contracting for his likeness to be used as well as doing the voice-work for the character. He starred along with Jamie Lee Curtis and Geoffrey Rush in The Tailor of Panama in 2001, and lent his voice to The Simpsons episode "Treehouse of Horror XII" as a machine.

Post-James Bond 

Since 2004, Brosnan has talked of backing a film about Caitlin Macnamara, wife of poet Dylan Thomas, the title role to be played by Miranda Richardson. Brosnan's first post-Bond role was that of Daniel Rafferty in 2004's Laws of Attraction. Garreth Murphy, of entertainment.ie, described Brosnan's performance as "surprisingly effective, gently riffing off his James Bond persona and supplementing it with a raffish energy". In the same year, Brosnan starred in After the Sunset alongside Salma Hayek and Woody Harrelson. The film received generally negative reviews and was a box office flop. Brosnan's next film was 2005's The Matador. He starred as Julian Noble, a jaded, neurotic assassin who meets a travelling salesman (Greg Kinnear) in a Mexican bar. The film garnered generally positive reviews. Roger Ebert for the Chicago Sun-Times called Brosnan's performance the best of his career. Brosnan was nominated for a Golden Globe award for Best Actor in a Musical or Comedy, but lost to Joaquin Phoenix for Walk the Line. In 2006, Brosnan narrated The Official Film of the 2006 FIFA World Cup, directed by Michael Apted.

In 2007, Brosnan appeared in the film Seraphim Falls alongside fellow Irishman Liam Neeson. The film was released for limited screenings on 26 January 2007 to average reviews. Kevin Crust of the Los Angeles Times noted that Brosnan and Neeson made "fine adversaries"; Michael Rechtshaffen of The Hollywood Reporter thought that they were "hard-pressed to inject some much-needed vitality into their sparse lines". During the same year, Brosnan spoke of making a western with fellow Irish actors Gabriel Byrne and Colm Meaney. In that same year Brosnan starred as Tom Ryan in Butterfly on a Wheel. The film was released in the United States under the name of Shattered and in Europe as Desperate Hours.

In 2008, Brosnan joined Meryl Streep in the film adaptation of the ABBA musical Mamma Mia!. He played Sam Carmichael, one of three men believed to be the father of Sophie (Amanda Seyfried), while Streep played Sophie's mother. Judy Craymer, producer of the film, said "Pierce brings a certain smooch factor, and we think he'll have great chemistry with Meryl in a romantic comedy." Brosnan's preparation in singing for the role included walking up and down the coast and singing karaoke to his own voice for about six weeks, followed by rehearsals in New York, which he noted "sounded dreadful". Brosnan's singing in the film was generally disparaged by critics, with his singing compared in separate reviews to the sound of a water buffalo, a donkey, and a wounded raccoon. In September 2008, Brosnan provided the narration for the Thomas & Friends movie The Great Discovery. He was originally set to narrate for both US and UK from Series 12 to Series 14, but withdrew from it for unknown reasons.

In 2009, Brosnan finished the well-received The Ghost Writer, playing a disgraced British Prime Minister, directed and produced by Roman Polanski. The film won a Silver Bear at the Berlin International Film Festival. He starred as Charles Hawkins in the film Remember Me and as Chiron in Percy Jackson & the Olympians: The Lightning Thief, both released in 2010. In 2012, Brosnan played the role of Philip in the Danish romantic comedy Love Is All You Need.

In February 2013, Brosnan was awarded honorary patronage of the Dublin University Players society at Trinity College, Dublin. He also starred opposite Owen Wilson in No Escape, playing a "heroic government agent". Brosnan was slated to star in Last Man Out, a crime film adapted from Stuart Neville's novel titled The Twelve (released as Ghosts of Belfast in the US) by Craig Ferguson and Ted Mulkerin, with director Terry Loan at the helm. However, it never came to fruition after years in development, and Brosnan is no longer attached to the production.

In 2013, Brosnan appeared in television commercials as a tongue in cheek version of himself to promote the launch of Sky Broadband in Ireland. In 2005, Brosnan was reported to be starring in The November Man, an adaptation of Bill Granger's novel, There Are No Spies. but the project was cancelled in 2007. After its cancellation, Brosnan's production company, "Irish DreamTime" resurrected The November Man in 2012 with an announcement made on his part that he was jumping back to the spy arena. Filming took place in Serbia a year later, with Brosnan in action as a retired CIA operative called Devereaux, alongside co-star Olga Kurylenko in a supporting role. The film was received negatively, with a 34% on Rotten Tomatoes and a 38/100 on Metacritic. In 2015, he appeared alongside Milla Jovovich in a suspense thriller movie written by Phil Shelby, called Survivor, which began filming in January 2014, with Charles and Irwin Winkler producing, and James McTeigue directing. Brosnan later starred in a revenge thriller called I.T., which was released in September 2016, in a limited release and through video on demand.

Brosnan replaced actor Sam Neill in the role of Eli McCullough in a television adaptation of Philipp Meyer's novel The Son, with Kevin Murphy serving as both executive producer and showrunner of the series, which began production in June 2016, and aired for two seasons from 2017 to 2019. In 2017, Brosnan starred in The Foreigner, opposite Jackie Chan, as a former IRA man turned government official, Liam Hennessy. The Foreigner was filmed in London, and was directed by Martin Campbell, who previously worked with Brosnan on his debut James Bond film, GoldenEye. It was noted that Brosnan's character bore a strong resemblance to Sinn Féin leader Gerry Adams.

A third-time collaboration with director Martin Campbell would have seen Brosnan starring in a film adaptation of Ernest Hemingway's 1950 novel Across the River and into the Trees. However, the reluctance of investors to finance the production along with several delays led both Brosnan and Campbell to drop out of the project. Paula Ortiz was later brought on to direct the film and Liev Schreiber replaced Brosnan in the lead role.

In 2018, Brosnan co-starred with Guy Pearce and Minnie Driver in a mystery thriller film called Spinning Man, based on George Harrar's novel of the same name. He later reprised his role as Sam Carmichael in the sequel to Catherine Johnson's Mamma Mia!, entitled Mamma Mia! Here We Go Again, along with the rest of the cast members from the first film. He also had a supporting role in the action thriller headlined by Dave Bautista in Final Score.

In 2021, Brosnan executive produced and starred in the heist caper entitled The Misfits directed by Renny Harlin from a screenplay by Robert Henry and Kurt Wimmer. The film was released to poor reception from critics. He also appeared in A24's horror film False Positive opposite Ilana Glazer, who co-wrote and co-produced it, as well. The film was a moderate success.

In March 2021, Brosnan was cast as Doctor Fate/Kent Nelson in the DC Extended Universe film, Black Adam. In July 2021, he joined Adam Devine in the Netflix action-comedy film The Out-Laws directed by Tyler Spindel.

In 2022, Brosnan starred as King Louis XIV in the family adventure film The King’s Daughter based on the 1997 novel The Moon and the Sun by Vonda N. McIntyre. It was set to have a limited theatrical release in the U.S. and Canada on 21 January 2022.

Upcoming roles 

Brosnan was touted to star opposite Jamie Dornan and Cillian Murphy in a film based on the events of The Maze Prison Escape, titled H-Block with Jim Sheridan at the helm. Initially, filming was to begin sometime in August 2017 before being postponed to March 2018 due to scheduling conflicts with cast members. As of today, preliminary production on the film is yet to commence.

Alongside Jesse Eisenberg and Vanessa Redgrave, Brosnan is set to appear in a historical period piece based on a novel by Jonathan Miles, entitled The Wreck of The Medusa, set against the backdrop of the early 19th century during King Louis XVIII's reign in France, with the film to be directed by Peter Webber. During an interview in October 2020, Webber claimed that the lack of interest in "films about artists" in the market earned the project several setbacks, and as such still remains in development.

In July 2017, a rumour surfaced that Brosnan was linked to an upcoming video game entitled Shadow Stalkers, a project led by ZOOM Platform. However, his role remains undisclosed as yet.

At Star Wars Celebration 2019 in Chicago, a mural was revealed showing an artist's rendering of Grand Admiral Thrawn with a strong resemblance to Brosnan, fuelling speculation about an upcoming role in the Star Wars franchise.

Shooting in spring 2022, Brosnan is set to lead the hitman thriller film Fast Charlie directed by Phillip Noyce.

Charity and activism 

Brosnan has been an Ambassador for UNICEF Ireland since 2001 and recorded a special announcement to mark the launch of UNICEF's "Unite for Children, Unite against AIDS" Campaign with Liam Neeson. Brosnan supported John Kerry in the 2004 presidential election and is a vocal supporter of same-sex marriage.

Brosnan first became aware of the nuclear arms race in 1962, at the age of nine, when worldwide condemnation of U.S. nuclear testing in Nevada made international headlines. During the 1990s, he participated in news conferences in Washington, D.C. to help Greenpeace draw attention to the campaign to bring an end to nuclear testing with a Comprehensive Nuclear-Test-Ban Treaty. Brosnan boycotted the French premiere of GoldenEye in support of Greenpeace's protest against the French nuclear testing program.

From 1997 to 2000, Brosnan and wife Smith worked with the Natural Resources Defense Council (NRDC) and International Fund for Animal Welfare (IFAW) to stop a proposed salt factory from being built at Laguna San Ignacio. The couple with Halle Berry, Cindy Crawford and Daryl Hannah successfully fought the Cabrillo Port Liquefied Natural Gas facility that was proposed off the coast of Malibu; the State Lands Commission eventually denied the lease to build the terminal. In May 2007, Governor Arnold Schwarzenegger vetoed the facility.

In May 2007, Brosnan and Smith donated $100,000 to help replace a playground on the Hawaiian island of Kauai, where they own a house. On 7 July 2007, Brosnan presented a film at Live Earth in London; he also recorded a television advertisement for the cause.

Brosnan is also listed as a member of the Sea Shepherd Conservation Society's Board of Advisors. In 2004, he was named 'Best-dressed Environmentalist' by the Sustainable Style Foundation.

Brosnan also raises money for charitable causes through sales of his paintings. After Brosnan left school, he pursued a career in art and began working as an illustrator. "I always wanted to be an artist, a painter. I started as a Trainee Artist in a small studio in South London." A colleague suggested that Pierce attend a theatre workshop, and eventually he abandoned his artwork to pursue a career in acting. Brosnan took up painting again in the late 1980s during his first wife's illness as he found it therapeutic. "Sometimes dramatic moments affect the way you see yourself in the world…from a very hard time in my life, I started painting again and out came every colour I could imagine." Citing his influences as Picasso, Matisse, Bonnard and Kandinsky, Brosnan spends much of his free time between film shoots in front of his easel. "I am self taught, an enthusiastic painter as a friend of mine likes to say." He has continued painting since then, using spare time on set and at home. Profits from sales of giclée prints of his works are given to a trust to benefit "environmental, children's and women's health charities." Since Harris' death, Brosnan has been an advocate for cancer awareness and, in 2006, he served as spokesperson for Lee National Denim Day, a breast cancer fundraiser which raises millions of dollars and raises more money in a single day than any other breast cancer fundraiser.

In 2021, Brosnan launched his first-ever NFT collection of digital artworks "Big Noise" - on a digital platform focusing on artist empowerment, sustainability and technical innovation - inspired by his painting "Earplugs" which he painted while filming the James Bond film GoldenEye, incorporating abstract movement, self-recorded sound elements, including his voice, and bespoke visuals.

Personal life 

Brosnan has married twice, having been widowed once, and has five children and four grandchildren. He met Australian actress Cassandra Harris through her stepson David Harris, the nephew of Richard Harris, shortly after leaving drama school. On meeting her, he said, "What a beautiful looking woman. I never for an instant thought she was someone I'd spend 17 years of my life with. I didn't think of wooing her, or attempting to woo her; I just wanted to enjoy her beauty and who she was." They began dating and bought a house in Wimbledon. They married in December 1980 and had one son together, Sean, who was born on 13 September 1983 and later became an actor. They also lived with Harris' children, Charlotte (1971–2013) and Chris, and Brosnan adopted them after their father Dermot Harris died in 1986; they subsequently took on his surname. Early in their relationship, Brosnan worked in West End plays and television films. After Harris appeared in the James Bond film For Your Eyes Only in 1981, they secured a bank loan and moved to Southern California, where Brosnan was cast in the title role of the TV series Remington Steele, easing their financial worries.

An episode of Remington Steele that was filmed in Ireland generated significant publicity. This led to Brosnan meeting his father, who had left when Brosnan was an infant, at his hotel. He expected to see a "very tall man" but instead described his father as "a man of medium stature, pushed-back silver hair, flinty eyes, and a twizzled jaw" who "had a very strong Kerry accent". He was regretful that they met under such public circumstances and wished for a more private arrangement.

While filming The Deceivers in Rajasthan in 1987, Harris became seriously ill. She was later diagnosed with ovarian cancer and died on 28 December 1991 at age 43. Brosnan struggled to cope with her death: "When your partner gets cancer, then life changes. Your timetable and reference for your normal routines and the way you view life, all this changes. Because you're dealing with death. You're dealing with the possibility of death and dying. And it was that way through the chemotherapy, through the first-look operation, the second look, the third look, the fourth look, the fifth look. Cassie was very positive about life. I mean, she had the most amazing energy and outlook on life. It was and is a terrible loss, and I see it reflected, from time to time, in my children." Harris had always wanted Brosnan to play James Bond; in 1995, four years after her death, Brosnan secured the role. His adopted daughter Charlotte also died of ovarian cancer, on 28 June 2013.

In 1994, Brosnan met American journalist Keely Shaye Smith in Mexico. They were married in 2001 at Ballintubber Abbey in Ireland. They have two sons together named Dylan and Paris. They reside primarily in Malibu, California, with a second American home in Hawaii and Irish residences in Dublin and County Meath. On 11 February 2015, the $18 million Malibu home caught fire and sustained $1 million in damages. During the 30 minutes it took firefighters to extinguish the fire, flames destroyed the contents of the garage, including Brosnan's 2002 Aston Martin V12 Vanquish, and spread to a bedroom above it; no injuries were sustained.

In July 2003, Queen Elizabeth II made Brosnan an honorary Officer of the Order of the British Empire for his "outstanding contribution to the British film industry". As an Irish citizen, he is ineligible to receive the full OBE honour, which is awarded only to a citizen of the Commonwealth realms, but he is still allowed the letters "OBE" after his name. In 2002, he was also awarded an honorary degree from the Dublin Institute of Technology and, a year later, the University College Cork. On 23 September 2004, he became an American citizen while retaining his Irish citizenship. He said, "My Irishness is in everything I do. It's the spirit of who I am, as a man, an actor, a father. It's where I come from." When asked by a fan if it annoyed him when people confused his nationality because of his fairly neutral accent, he said, "It amuses me in some respects that they should confuse me with an Englishman when I'm a dyed-in-the-wool, born and bred Irishman... I don't necessarily fly under any flag, but no, it doesn't bother me."

Brosnan has expressed contempt for his Christian Brothers education, but commented in 2013, "It always helps to have a bit of prayer in your back pocket. At the end of the day, you have to have something and for me that is God, Jesus, my Catholic upbringing, my faith... God has been good to me. My faith has been good to me in the moments of deepest suffering, doubt and fear. It is a constant, the language of prayer. I might not have got my sums right from the Christian Brothers or might not have got the greatest learning of literature from them, but I certainly got a strapping amount of faith." He attends Mass but also adheres to other spiritual beliefs, stating in 2008 that he loves "the teachings of Buddhist philosophy", which he referred to as his "own private faith". He elaborated, "I don't preach it, but it's a faith that is a comfort to me when the night is long."

Filmography

Film

Television

Video games

References

External links 

 
 
 

1953 births
Living people
20th-century American male actors
20th-century Irish male actors
21st-century American male actors
21st-century Irish male actors
Actors from County Meath
Alumni of Saint Martin's School of Art
Alumni of the Drama Centre London
American anti–nuclear weapons activists
American environmentalists
American film producers
American humanitarians
American male film actors
American male television actors
American male video game actors
American male voice actors
American philanthropists
Honorary Officers of the Order of the British Empire
Irish emigrants to the United States
Irish environmentalists
Irish expatriate male actors in the United States
Irish expatriates in the United Kingdom
Irish film producers
Irish humanitarians
Irish male film actors
Irish male television actors
Irish male video game actors
Irish male voice actors
20th-century Irish philanthropists
Male actors from County Louth
People associated with University College Cork
People from Drogheda
People from Malibu, California
People from Navan
People with acquired American citizenship
21st-century Irish philanthropists